Simonne Mathieu and Elizabeth Ryan were the defending champions, but Ryan did not compete. Mathieu partnered with Hilde Sperling, but lost to Freda James and Kay Stammers in the final, 6–1, 6–4.

Seeds

  Dorothy Andrus /  Sylvie Henrotin (third round)
  Simonne Mathieu /  Hilde Sperling (final)
  Freda James /  Kay Stammers (champions)
  Elsie Pittman /  Billie Yorke (third round)

Draw

Finals

Top half

Section 1

Section 2

The nationality of K Smith is unknown.

Bottom half

Section 3

Section 4

References

External links

Women's Doubles
Wimbledon Championship by year – Women's doubles
Wimbledon Championships - Doubles
Wimbledon Championships - Doubles